The men's 5000 metres race of the 2015–16 ISU Speed Skating World Cup 5, arranged in the Sørmarka Arena in Stavanger, Norway, was held on 30 January 2016.

Sven Kramer of the Netherlands won the race, while his compatriot Jorrit Bergsma came second, and Ted-Jan Bloemen of Canada came third. Patrick Roest of the Netherlands won the Division B race.

Results
The race took place on Saturday, 30 January, with Division B scheduled in the morning session, at 11:47, and Division A scheduled in the afternoon session, at 16:43.

Division A

Division B

References

Men 5000
5